Dermomurex obeliscus is a species of sea snail, a marine gastropod mollusk in the family Muricidae, the murex snails or rock snails.

Description
The length of the shell varies between 15 mm and 33 m.

Distribution
This species occurs in the Pacific Ocean from Mexico to Costa Rica.

References

 Merle D., Garrigues B. & Pointier J.-P. (2011) Fossil and Recent Muricidae of the world. Part Muricinae. Hackenheim: Conchbooks. 648 pp. page(s): 214

External links
 

Gastropods described in 1853
Dermomurex